Kirdaar is an Indian television series aired on DD National directed by Gulzar. It ran between 1993 and 1994, based on short stories written by different writers in different languages, mainly Urdu, Hindi and Bengali writers. The short stories were featured from famous writers like Ahmed Nadeem Qasmi, Urdu writer from Pakistan, Malti Joshi in Hindi, and Samaresh Basu in Bengali. It starred Om Puri playing various characters in all the episodes and different actors in each episode like Surekha Sikri, Irrfan Khan, Reema Lagoo and Neena Gupta.

Cast
Om Puri (13 episodes)
Surekha Sikri
Ananya Khare (5 episodes) (credited as Priti Khare)
Sadiya Siddiqui (2 episodes)
Bhupendra (4 episodes)
Nadira (2 episodes)
Irrfan Khan (3 episodes)
Neena Gupta (1 episode)
Mita Vashisht (2 episodes)
Reema Lagoo (1 episode)
Shahib Abbas (4 episodes)
Mita Vashisht (1 episode)

Episodes
Alaan
Hisaab Kitaab
Haath Peele Kar Do
Khuda Hafiz
Bel Nimbu
Culture
Sunset Boulevard Part 1
Sunset Boulevard Part 2
Mann Dhuan Dhuan
Mukhbir
Rehman ki Jutti
Shikoh
Baba Noor

References

External links
 

DD National original programming
1993 Indian television series debuts
Gulzar
Indian anthology television series
1994 Indian television series endings
Television shows based on short fiction